El Salvador participated in the 2010 Summer Youth Olympics in Singapore.

Fencing

Group stage

Knock-Out Stage

Gymnastics

Artistic Gymnastics

Girls

Rowing

Table tennis

Individual

Team

References

External links 
Competitors List: El Salvador

2010 in Salvadoran sport
Nations at the 2010 Summer Youth Olympics
El Salvador at the Youth Olympics